Denise Marcelle Bindschler-Robert (July 10, 1920 in Saint-Imier - November 17, 2008 in Bern) was a Swiss international lawyer. From 1975 to 1991, she represented Switzerland at the European Court of Human Rights. In 1966, she was elected as the first woman in the synodal council of the Christian Catholic Church in Switzerland, to which she belonged until 1985.

References

1920 births
2008 deaths
20th-century Swiss lawyers
20th-century women lawyers